William Blair & Company ("William Blair") is American multinational independent investment bank and financial services company focusing on investment banking, investment management, and private wealth management. The firm currently reports $17 billion of reportable assets and 1,700 open positions.

The firm, which opened in 1935, is independent and employee-owned, operating in more than 20 offices with headquarters in Chicago, Illinois. The firm has had five CEOs or managing partners, three of whom continue to work at the firm. John Ettelson, who has served as president and CEO since 2004, heads the firm's executive committee.

See also
 List of investment banks
 Boutique investment bank

References

External links 
 

Financial services companies established in 1935
Banks established in 1935
Investment banks in the United States
Companies based in Chicago